Diploderma drukdaypo, also known as the dwarf mountain dragon, is a species of lizard native to Tibet.

References 

Diploderma
Lizards of Asia
Reptiles described in 2019